Sedik is a surname. Notable people with the surname include:

Ahmad Sedik (born 1983), Egyptian footballer
Mohamed Sedik (born 1978), Egyptian footballer

See also
Sadik